These are The Official Charts Company UK Official Indie Chart number one hits of 1996.

See also
1996 in music

References

United Kingdom Indie Singles
Indie 1996
UK Indie Chart number-one singles